Angel Amaya (born 11 February 1934) is a Venezuelan boxer. He competed in the men's bantamweight event at the 1952 Summer Olympics. At the 1952 Summer Olympics, he lost to Raúl Macías of Mexico.

References

External links

1934 births
Living people
Venezuelan male boxers
Olympic boxers of Venezuela
Boxers at the 1952 Summer Olympics
Place of birth missing (living people)
Bantamweight boxers